Constantin Miculescu (6 September 1863 – 29 December 1937) was a Romanian physicist.

A professor at the University of Bucharest, his research focused on heat, optics and acoustics. Miculescu is noted for his 1891 determination, with great precision, of the mechanical equivalent of the calorie using water circulated in a calorimeter.

Notes

1863 births
1937 deaths
Romanian physicists
Academic staff of the University of Bucharest
Members of the Romanian Academy of Sciences